Wade Herbert Flemons (September 25, 1940 – October 13, 1993) was an American soul singer.

He was born in Coffeyville, Kansas to Samuel and Kathyrine Flemons. His father was a minister, who introduced him to gospel music. After his parents' marriage ended in divorce, Wade moved to Battle Creek, Michigan, where his mother was living, in 1955. 
A graduate of Battle Creek Central High School, Flemons began recording solo work in 1958. He was only 17 when he had his first charting pop song, "Here I Stand," which he wrote and recorded with his band, the New Comers. He was signed to Chicago-based Vee-Jay Records; "Here I Stand" was a regional hit, and peaked at #80 on the Hot 100. It earned him an appearance on American Bandstand in 1958, as well as an appearance on the Alan Freed Show. Subsequent releases did not become hits, however, and Flemons began doing session work at Chicago recording studios, and also writing commercial jingles; one of his writing partners was Maurice White, later the founder of Earth, Wind & Fire.  

Flemons gained a reputation as a prolific songwriter: during his career, he wrote as many as 200 songs for himself and for other musicians.  Having developed a good writing relationship with Maurice White, he was asked to become part of White's band called the Salty Peppers in 1969.  Flemons subsequently went on to join White in his next venture, working as a vocalist in the pop band Earth, Wind & Fire between 1971 and 1972.  Some of Flemons' songs away from the group are still revived, especially with the Northern soul movement in the UK, notably "That Other Place" and "Jeanette", recorded in 1968.

Flemons married in 1980; he and his wife Brenda had a daughter and three sons. He died from cancer in Battle Creek, Michigan, at age 53. A United States Army veteran who served in the Vietnam War, he was buried at the Fort Custer National Cemetery in Augusta, Michigan.

One of his sons, Brian Wade Flemons, followed in his father's footsteps and also became a musician.

Discography

Studio albums 

 Wade Flemons (1959)

Singles

Other releases 
1960
 "Little John Green" 
 "Ain't That Lovin' You Baby" / "I'll Come Runnin"
1961
 "At the Party" / "Devil in Your Soul"
1962
 "I Hope, I Think, I Wish" / "Ain't These Tears?"
 "Half a Love" / "Welcome Stranger"
1963
 "I Came Running (Back From the Party)" / "That Time of Year"
1964
 "I Knew You When" / "That Other Place"
 "Watch Over Her" / "When It Rains It Pours"
1965
 "Empty Balcony" / "Where Did You Go Last Night"
1968
 "Jeanette" / "What A Price to Pay"
 "Two of a Kind" / "I Knew You'd Be Mine"

References

Notes

External links
 Wade Flemons Biography at rockabilly.nl
  Discography
 

1940 births
1993 deaths
American soul singers
People from Coffeyville, Kansas
people from Battle Creek, Michigan
Singers from Kansas
Vee-Jay Records artists
Earth, Wind & Fire members
Deaths from cancer in Michigan
20th-century American singers